Arbelodes kruegeri is a moth in the family Metarbelidae. It is found in South Africa, where it has been recorded from the Cederberg. The habitat consists of submontane and montane woody riparian areas.

The length of the forewings is about 13 mm. The forewings are glossy light greyish olive with deep greyish olive spots along the costa. The hindwings are glossy greyish olive.

Etymology
The species is named for Dr Martin Krüger.

References

Natural History Museum Lepidoptera generic names catalog

Endemic moths of South Africa
Moths described in 2010
Metarbelinae